Galdhøpiggen summer ski centre is a glacial ski resort which lies in Juvbreen at the foot of Galdhøpiggen in Oppland. The resort has a T-bar lift, with capacity of 1200 persons per hour, and one slope which is 1400 meters long with a 350 meter height difference. The ground is well suited to both alpine skiing and snowboarding. It is the highest located ski centre in Scandinavia. The season is usually from late May until October.

References

External links
 Official website (Norwegian)

Oppland
Tourist attractions in Oppland
Ski areas and resorts in Norway
Galdhøpiggen